The 1966 Tripoli Fair Tournament was the 5th edition of football at the Tripoli International Fair, and was held from 11 to 19 March 1966 in Tripoli, Libya. Four teams participated: Iraq, Morocco, Libya, and Tunisia. Morocco won the tournament after beating Iraq 2–1 in the playoff match.

Matches

Playoff

References

Tripoli International Fair
1966
1966 Tripoli International Fair